Forbidden Cargo may refer to:

 Forbidden Cargo (1925 film), an American film starring Boris Karloff: rum-running from Bahamas to United States 
 Forbidden Cargo (1954 film), a British film starring Jack Warner: customs officer and birdwatcher tackle drug smugglers

See also
 Forbidden Cargoes, a 1925 British film starring Clifford McLaglen